Otionigera is a genus of flies in the family Stratiomyidae.

Distribution
Madagascar.

Species
Otionigera acuticornis Lindner, 1966

References

Stratiomyidae
Brachycera genera
Taxa named by Erwin Lindner
Diptera of Africa
Endemic fauna of Madagascar